The 1968–69 Honduran Liga Nacional season was the 4th edition of the Honduran Liga Nacional.  The format of the tournament consisted of a three round-robin schedule.  C.D. Motagua won the title and qualified to the 1969 CONCACAF Champions' Cup.

1968–69 teams

 C.D. Atlético Español (Tegucigalpa)
 Atlético Indio (Tegucigalpa)
 C.D. España (San Pedro Sula)
 C.D. Honduras (El Progreso)
 C.D. Marathón (San Pedro Sula)
 C.D. Motagua (Tegucigalpa)
 C.D. Olimpia (Tegucigalpa)
 C.D. Platense (Puerto Cortés)
 C.D. Victoria (La Ceiba, promoted)
 C.D.S. Vida (La Ceiba)

Regular season

Standings

Top scorer
  Roberto Abrussezze (Motagua) with 16 goals

Squads

References

Liga Nacional de Fútbol Profesional de Honduras seasons
1
Honduras